Latin music in the United States is defined by both the Recording Industry Association of America (RIAA) and Billboard magazine as any release with 51% or more of its content recorded in Spanish. The best performing Latin songs in the United States are compiled by Billboard since September 1986. The magazine had already a major overall songs chart titled Hot 100 since August 1958. Since 2007, the chart tracks digital sales, streaming figures and radio airplay. Prior to that, the Hot 100 only measured the latter format.

Ritchie Valens' cover version of "La Bamba" became the first Spanish-language song to enter the Hot 100 after its debut on January 3, 1959. "Guantanamera" by The Sandpipers became the first predominantly Spanish-language song to reach the top ten of the chart in September 1966. "Eres Tú" by Mocedades is credited as the first completely-Spanish-language song to reach the top ten of the chart after peaking at number nine on March 23, 1974, a milestone that was followed up 44 years later by Bad Bunny's "Mia" featuring Drake, which also holds the record for the highest debut for a Spanish-language song after entering at number five on October 27, 2018. As of October 2017, only three primarily Spanish-language songs had topped the Billboard Hot 100: "La Bamba" by Los Lobos in 1987, "Macarena" by Los del Río in 1996, and "Despacito" by Luis Fonsi and Daddy Yankee featuring Justin Bieber in 2017.

In June 2017, following the number one peak of "Despacito" in the Hot 100, Philip Bump of The Washington Post related the increasing success of Spanish-language songs in the United States since 2004 with the growth of its Spanish-speaking population, highlighting an improve from 4.9% in 1980 to 11.5% in 2015. In January 2018, Leila Cobo of Billboard related the success of "Despacito" and the increase of music consumption via streaming to the rise of predominantly Spanish-language songs charting on the Hot 100.

Latin songs on the Hot 100

As of the week ending November 12, 2022, 240 Spanish-language and two Portuguese-language songs have entered the Hot 100 chart, most of them in 2022 with 41 debuts, followed by 2020 with 35, 2019 and 2021 with 21, and 2017 with 18. 35 Latin songs debuted on the chart during the 2000s decade, a figure that increased during the 2010s decade to 80 singles and again in the 2020s decade to 115. Only 10 Latin tracks entered the Hot 100 between 1959 and 1999.

A total of 71 singles have ranked within the top 50, of which only 37 reached the top 25, sixteen managed to reach the top 10, and three have peaked at number one. Of the 168 songs that have ranked within the bottom half of the chart, 54 peaked between numbers 90 and 100, 35 peaked between numbers 80 and 89, and 79 peaked between numbers 51 and 79.

47 tracks have had a chart run of 20 or more weeks, of which only two remained on the Hot 100 for more than 50 weeks. 46 songs have had a chart run that ranged between 10 and 19 weeks, while 40 tracks remained on the list for between five and nine weeks. 107 of the Hot 100's Latin entries charted for less than five weeks, of which 64 had only one week on the chart.

Puerto Rican singer Bad Bunny is the act with the most Spanish-language entries on the chart, with 66. He also achieved eight, thirteen, and 26 top 10, top 25, and top 50 Spanish-language singles, respectively, the most by any artist. Puerto Rican singer Ricky Martin is the first and only artist with Spanish-language entries in three decades.

1958–1989

1990–1999

2000–2009

2010–2019

2020–present

Latin songs on Billboards Year-End Hot 100 Songs charts

Latin songs on Billboards Greatest Hot 100 Songs of All-Time list
In 2008, for the 50th anniversary of the Hot 100, Billboard compiled a ranking of the 100 best-performing songs on the chart since its inception in 1958. The ranking was revised in 2013, 2015 and 2018. As of 2018, only two primarily Spanish-language songs have appeared on the top 100: "Macarena" (Bayside Boys Mix) by Los del Río, which peaked at number five on the ranking's first edition in 2008, and "Despacito" by Luis Fonsi and Daddy Yankee featuring Justin Bieber. Additionally, Los Lobos' version of "La Bamba" ranks at number 372.

Notes

References

Lists of songs
Latin songs